The Pipiripau River is a river of the Federal District in central Brazil.

See also
List of rivers of the Federal District

References
Brazilian Ministry of Transport

Rivers of Federal District (Brazil)